The 2021 Big East men's basketball tournament was a postseason men's basketball tournament for the Big East Conference. It was held from March 10 through March 13, 2021, at Madison Square Garden in New York City.

Georgetown received the conference's bid to the 2021 NCAA tournament.

Seeds
All 11 Big East schools participated in the tournament. Teams were seeded by the conference record with tie-breaking procedures to determine the seeds for teams with identical conference records. The top five teams received first-round byes. Seeding for the tournament was determined at the close of the regular conference season.

Schedule

Bracket

* denotes overtime period

See also
2021 Big East women's basketball tournament

References

Tournament
Big East men's basketball tournament
Basketball competitions in New York City
College sports tournaments in New York City
Sports in Manhattan
Big East men's basketball tournament
Big East men's basketball tournament
2020s in Manhattan